Chaetonotidae is a family of gastrotrichs in the order Chaetonotida. It is the largest family of gastrotrichs with almost 400 species, some of which are marine and some freshwater. Current classification is largely based on shape and external structures but these are highly variable. Molecular studies show a high level of support for a clade containing Dasydytidae nested within Chaetonotidae.

Genera
The following genera are included in the family Chaetonotidae according to the World Register of Marine Species:
Subfamily Chaetonotinae Kisielewski, 1991
Genus Arenotus Kisielewski, 1987
Arenotus strixinoi Kisielewski, 1987
Genus Aspidiophorus Voigt, 1903
Genus Caudichthydium Schwank, 1990
Genus Chaetonotus Ehrenberg, 1830
Genus Fluxiderma d'Hondt, 1974
Genus Halichaetonotus Remane, 1936
Genus Heterolepidoderma Remane, 1926
Genus Ichthydium Ehrenberg, 1830
Genus Lepidochaetus Kisielewski, 1991
Genus Lepidoderma
Genus Lepidodermella Blake, 1933
Genus Polymerurus Remane, 1927
Genus Rhomballichthys Schwank, 1990
Genus Chitonodytes
Genus Hemichaetonotus
Genus Pseudichthydium
Subfamily Undulinae Kisielewski, 1991
Genus Undula'' Kisielewski, 1991

References

External links

Gastrotricha
Platyzoa families
Taxa named by Philip Henry Gosse